24 Hour Service Station is an American independent record label founded by Marshall Dickson in Tampa, Florida, in 1993. Among its releases are Ceremony - A New Order Tribute, a charity album, and albums from artists such as Freebass, Peter Hook and The Light, The Beauvilles, John Ralston, and punk band Pink Lincolns. It also operates the division 24 Hour Distribution, a global media distribution network which is partnered with entities such as the Independent Online Distribution Alliance and The Orchard.

History

Founding
24 Hour Service Station's first signing in 1994 was Rosewater Elizabeth, an up-and-coming ethereal group in the Tampa Bay area music scene. The label then went on to release records by Shoemaker Levy 9, Questionface, and a tribute album to The Smiths entitled Godfathers of Change. In 1997, Dickson put the label "underground" to take a different path in the music business, starting a sales and marketing career with Sony Music.

Re-launch
In 2007, Dickson re-launched the record label while also maintaining the helm as General Manager of Reax Music Magazine. The label then released the Car Bomb Driver album Evacuate, and by 2008, 24 Hour Service Station had put out a total of 17 releases and signed 13 bands including History, Win Win Winter, and The Beauvilles. Songwriter and guitarist John Wesley, who had released two albums on 24 Hour in the mid-1990s and another during the hiatus (The Emperor Falls), continued releasing music on the label during the restart. By 2009 artists such as electronics musician Pocket and Kites With Lights had signed to the label, with The Fantastiques, a band from Minsk, Belarus, following suit.

Ceremony - A New Order Tribute (2009)

Ceremony – A New Order Tribute is a 2009 compilation album of New Order covers by independent acts from the United States and Europe, compiled into a double CD Digi-pack and two additional digital albums. Produced by Sonshine Ward and Marshall Dickson, it was released in February 2010 by 24 Hour Service Station, with contributions from artists such as Peter Hook of Joy Division, Kites With Lights, and Rabbit in the Moon.

Allmusic reviewer William Ruhlmann gave the digital album 3.5/5 stars, and praised in particular the tracks that strayed in style from the original New Order compositions.

The album is dedicated to the founder of Factory Records and New Order producer Tony Wilson, who died in 2007 from cancer. Marshall Dickson was originally inspired by Wilson to start 24 Hour Service Station. The album benefits the Salford Foundation Trust's Tony Wilson Award. Artists donated time and recordings to support the charity, which "assists young people who demonstrate a special talent or ambition in the arts or creative skills."

Recent years
In 2010 Freebass released the first of several albums on the label. The group includes Peter Hook of Joy Division & New Order, Gary "Mani" Mounfield of The Stone Roses & Primal Scream, Andy Rourke of The Smiths, Phil Murphy of Man Ray, Paul Kehoe of Monaco and Gary Briggs of Haven. Peter Hook also played in two other bands that signed to the label; Man Ray with Phil Murphy, and Peter Hook and The Light. Fritz von Runte, a DJ and producer based in England, does frequently work with the label.

Most of the bands signing to the label remained from the Tampa, Florida region, including The Beauvilles, Non-aggression Pact, singer-songwriter John Ralston, and punk rock band Pink Lincolns. Yes But No, a duo of young sisters that contributed to the Ceremony compilation, are also from the area.

24 Hour Distribution
24 Hour Distribution is a global media distribution network, delivering content to over 250 International digital music outlets including iTunes, eMusic, Rhapsody and Spotify, via a partnership with Independent Online Distribution Alliance and The Orchard. Physical products are available to retailers in the United States and Canada such as Best Buy, Barnes & Noble and F.Y.E., and Independent music stores including the coalitions A.I.M.S., C.I.M.S. & Music Monitor Network, and One-Stop fulfillment including Amazon.com, Alliance Entertainment Corporation (A.E.C.), Baker & Taylor Inc. and Super D / Phantom. 24 Hour Distribution exports physical goods to vendors in Europe, Asia, South America, Australia and New Zealand.

Among its distribution clients are Peter Hook's label Hacienda Records UK, and In a Circle Records, which handle Brooklyn Rider, Yo-Yo Ma, and The Knights.

Label artists
The following artists and bands have released music on the label, as of October 2013:

 Blue Eyes
 The Beauvilles
 Car Bomb Driver
 Daddy Lion
 John Ralston
 Fritz von Runte
 Tommy Simms
 Noah Kussack
 Kites With Lights
 The Fantastiques
 Win Win Winter
 History
 John Wesley
 Questionface
 Rosewater Elizabeth
 Man Ray - Peter Hook  & Phil Murphy
 Mosley
 Non-aggression Pact
 Underwater
 Simon Said...
 Skinnys 21
 Shoemaker Levy 9
 X.O.X.O.
 Freebass
Peter Hook of Joy Division & New Order, Gary "Mani" Mounfield of The Stone Roses & Primal Scream, Andy Rourke of The Smiths, Phil Murphy of Man Ray, Paul Kehoe of Monaco and Gary Briggs of Haven
 Pocket
Richard Jankovich collaborating with Robyn Hitchcock, Steve Kilbey of The Church, Yuki Chikudate of Asobi Seksu, Craig Wedren of Shudder to Think, Dave Smalley, Mark Burgess of The Chameleons UK, Danny Seim of Menomena, Tanya Donelly
Yung Hod

Gallery

Discography

See also
Reax Music Magazine
Lists of record labels

References

External links
Official website
Distribution website
24 Hour Service Station at Discogs
24 Hour Service Station at MusicBrainz

 
American independent record labels
Indie rock record labels
Record labels established in 1993
24 Hour Distribution